"Sweat / Answer" is the 41st Japanese single by South Korean pop duo Tohoshinki, released on June 11, 2014 by Avex Trax. It is a double A-sided single featuring "Sweat", a summer-themed jazz-pop dance track; and "Answer", a mid-tempo electropop song that was used as the theme song for the 2013 Japanese television crime drama, . The single was released in three versions – a CD+DVD version, a CD only version, and a fan club edition exclusively for Tohoshinki's Japanese fan club, Bigeast.

The single debuted atop the Billboard Japan Hot 100 and peaked at number two on the Oricon Singles Chart. It was certified gold by the Recording Industry Association of Japan (RIAJ) for shipments of over 100,000.

Release and promotion
"Answer" was used as the theme song for the Japanese crime drama Hard Nut, which premiered on the satellite television channel NHK BS-Premium in October 2013. It is pinned to be an electropop song with "emotional" vocals. On April 22, 2014, the first day of Tohoshinki's seventh nationwide concert tour Tree: Live Tour 2014, a notice was put up on Tohoshinki's official website announcing the official release date of the new single. "Sweat" was described to be a "mature" jazz-pop dance song that is suitable for the summer. The duo included a performance of "Sweat" for the encore segment of their Tree Tour, which is expected to conclude on June 22, 2014 in Osaka.

Tohoshinki's official website revealed the artworks for the single on May 15. The jackets were filmed on April 19 at Chatan, Okinawa, where the promotional video for "Sweat" was also filmed. The video shoot, which took twelve hours to film, was officially released online on May 23.

Chart performance
Debuting at number two on the daily Oricon Singles Chart, "Sweat / Answer" sold 78,053 copies on the first day of release. It maintained its number-two spot for the next few days, eventually reaching to number-one on the sixth day of release. On the weekly Oricon Singles Chart, "Sweat / Answer" debuted at number two with 119,301 copies sold in the first week. On the Billboard Japan Hot 100, the single debuted at number one. "Sweat" peaked at number 47 on the Billboard Japan Adult Contemporary Airplay.

Formats and track listings

Digital download single
"Sweat" – 3:33
"Answer" – 3:47

CD+DVD single AVCK-79199/B
Disc 1 (CD)
"Sweat"
"Answer"
"Sweat -Less Vocal-"
"Answer -Less Vocal-"

Disc 2 (DVD)
"Sweat" (Video Clip)
"Sweat" (Off Shot Movie) (AVCK-79197/B – First Press only)

CD single AVCK-79198
"Sweat"
"Answer"
"Sweat -Boogie-Woogie Version"
"Sweat -Less Vocal-"
"Answer -Less Vocal-"
CD-EXTRA: Jacket Making Movie (First Press only)

CD single (Bigeast limited edition) AVC1-79200
"Sweat"
"Answer"
"Sweat -Less Vocal-"
"Answer -Less Vocal-"
CD-EXTRA: Tree Off Shot Movie

Charts

Sales

Release history

Certifications

References

External links

TVXQ songs
2014 singles
Japanese-language songs
2014 songs
Avex Trax singles